The Alliance of the North was a Canadian social conservative and right-wing populist political party, originating from the province of Quebec. In the 2015 federal election, the party nominated its leader François Bélanger in Lévis—Lotbinière. Bélanger did not win a seat. The party was deregistered by Elections Canada on September 15, 2019.

Ideology 

On its website, the party created a list of six (6) priorities, developed in September 2013, which form the foundation of its ideology. Among the priorities include reducing the size of the federal government, reducing the number of immigrants accepted into Canada to 150,000 per year, promoting a right to bear arms, launching a federal investigation into "criminal bankers", and "removing" the Canadian Charter of Rights and Freedoms.

Election results 

The party leader François Bélanger ran as the party's only candidate in the 2015 federal election in the Quebec riding of Lévis—Lotbinière. He received 136 votes or 0.2% of the vote, placing last among the six candidates to contest the riding.

Electoral performance

References

External links
Alliance du Nord – Canadian Political Parties and Political Interest Groups - Web Archive created by the University of Toronto Libraries

Federal political parties in Canada
Political parties established in 2013
Right-wing populism in Canada
Anti-immigration politics in Canada